Sabauri – is a Georgian family name from the Meskheti region in the south-western Georgia.

Sabauri family name comes from town of Borjomi.

References

Georgian-language surnames